The Japanese Economic Review is a peer-reviewed academic journal of economics published since 1959 by the Japanese Economic Association. It was formerly called The Economic Studies Quarterly.

Abstracting and indexing 
According to the Journal Citation Reports, the journal has a 2014 impact factor of 0.351, ranking it 275th out of 333 journals in the category "Economics".

See also 
 List of economics journals

References

External links
 

Economics journals
Publications established in 1959
Wiley-Blackwell academic journals
Quarterly journals
English-language journals